Kawthekar High School is a high school run by the Pandharpur Education Society, that is located in Pandharpur, Maharashtra, India. The school was inaugurated on 12 June 1947 with 150 students and 5 teachers.

In addition to teaching and laboratory facilities, Kawthekar High has a large auditorium and a particularly extensive library. It is only school, along with D.H.K High school, in the entire Solapur district that teaches Sanskrit to all its students.

References

External links
 

Solapur district
High schools and secondary schools in Maharashtra
Educational institutions established in 1947
1947 establishments in India